Housing at the Massachusetts Institute of Technology (MIT) consists of eleven undergraduate dormitories and nine graduate dorms. All undergraduate students are required to live in an MIT residence during their first year of study. Undergraduate dorms are usually divided into suites or floors, and usually have Graduate Resident Assistants (GRA), graduate students living among the undergraduates who help support student morale and social activities. Many MIT undergraduate dorms are known for their distinctive student cultures and traditions.

Both undergraduate and graduate dorms have a resident Head of House, usually a member of the MIT faculty, living in a special apartment suite within the building. Some larger dorms have multiple Heads of House, each responsible for a section of the building, who consult together on building-wide issues.

McCormick Hall is a women-only dorm; all other dorms are coeducational. Eastgate and Westgate are designated for graduate student family housing, and all other dorms are reserved for single students.

In addition, a portion of MIT undergraduate upperclassmen live in MIT Fraternities, Sororities, and Independent Living Groups (FSILGs), either on campus or nearby in Cambridge, Boston, or Brookline, Massachusetts.

Overview

Dormitory cultures
Over the years, MIT undergrad dormitories have developed a diverse range of cultures and traditions. With occasional local exceptions, the West Campus dorms (Maseeh, McCormick, Baker, Burton-Conner, MacGregor, New, Next, Simmons) have tended to be more mainstream in their outlook, while the East Side dorms (East Campus, Senior House, Random, Bexley) have been the home of many different subcultures, such as LGBTQ, Goth, counterculture, and anarchist. Since 2002, MIT has required all first-year undergrads to reside in dormitories, partly to control irresponsible abuse of alcohol in some fraternities, which had resulted in the death of a freshman.

A new, 450-bed undergrad dormitory at 189 Vassar Street (Building W46) was completed in the fall of 2020, and opened for students in the spring semester of 2021. Burton-Conner is scheduled to close for two years (June 2020 to August 2022) for a complete renovation. East Campus is scheduled to be closed for renovation starting in June 2023.

Design goals
In 2016, the MIT administration published its guidelines for design of new and renovation of older undergraduate dormitories. An ideal size of 350 students per dormitory, organized into "clusters" of 30 students was proposed, consisting of 30-40% singles and the remainder double-occupancy rooms. Each room is to be equipped with furniture made of durable oak wood, designed to be modular and somewhat reconfigurable by the residents. Three bathrooms (allowing flexible gender designation) would be shared by each cluster of rooms, equipped with shared sinks and individually enclosed toilets and showers.

The report viewed shared cooking and dining facilities as essential parts of MIT student life and education. Some dorms would contain dining halls, and others would be designated as "cook-for-yourself" residences. Both types would also have some accommodations for larger group dining and individual or group cooking, including large "country kitchens" for groups of students working together. Informal and formal teaching about diet and cooking would be encouraged, in response to the expressed interest of many MIT students in learning how to cook. Dining halls would be structured for ease of access by other members of the MIT community, including students, faculty, and staff not residing in the host dorm, to facilitate wider social interactions and events.

The guidelines say that number of rooms and facilities should be shared dorm-wide, such as spaces for music rehearsal, games, media viewing, studying, exercising, meeting, and other individual or group activities. Makerspaces are increasingly emphasized to support MIT's founding mens et manus ("Mind and Hand") ethos and participation in the arts and athletics. A large enclosed exterior space or courtyard should be provided, gated for security while permitting wider community access for special occasions, and protected from solar glare and excessive wind.

The guidelines also state that dormitories should be designed to qualify for LEED gold certification, including central air conditioning to discourage improvised window air conditioner installations and to enable year-round use of the buildings. The new Vassar Street dormitory (Building W46) was specifically designed with these guidelines in mind.

Dining options
The MIT administration has emphasized incorporation of shared dining facilities into several larger undergraduate dormitories, as places where daily informal social interactions can occur. After discontinuation of "mandatory commons" in 1970, MIT continued to operate dining halls in several dormitories on an opt-in meal plan basis.
Required meal plans were reinstituted in fall 2011 for residents of several dormitories, despite the vigorous objections of some students. , the MIT meal plans offer a mix of choices, required for residents of some dorms, and optional for all other undergraduates and all grad students.

, the mandatory meal plan dorms are:
 Baker House
 Maseeh Hall (the only meal plan hall which is also open for lunch)
 McCormick Hall
 Next House
 Simmons Hall

The other dorms are designated as "cook-for-yourself" communities, and have kitchens on each floor, or in each suite of apartments. Residents of these dorms may also opt to sign up for a meal plan at another dorm with dining facilities, or may eat at any dining hall on a "cash" basis. Free shuttle service is available to selected grocery stores off campus and there is a fresh produce market on campus open one day per week throughout most of the calendar year.

Undergraduate dorms

Baker House

Baker House, located at 362 Memorial Drive, is a co-ed dormitory at MIT designed by the Finnish architect Alvar Aalto in 1947–1948 and built in 1949. Its distinctive design has an undulating shape which allows most rooms a view of the Charles River, and the dining hall features a "moon garden" roof. Aalto also designed custom furniture for the building's rooms, many of which are wedge-shaped. Baker House was renovated for its fiftieth anniversary in 1999, modernizing the plumbing, telecommunications, and electrical systems and removing some of the interior changes made over the years that were not in Aalto's original design.

The dorm was named after Everett Moore Baker, an MIT Dean of Students, who died in a plane crash in India in 1949. The dormitory houses 318 undergraduates in single, double, triple, and quadruple rooms.

A Baker House tradition involves dropping an old worn-out piano from the roof. Started by former Baker resident Charles Bruno in 1972, the piano is dropped on Drop Day—the last day MIT students can drop a class with no penalty.

Notable Baker House alumni include Kenneth Olsen (Electrical Engineering, 1950), co-founder of Digital Equipment Corporation; Amar Bose (Electrical Engineering, 1951), founder of the Bose Corporation and inventor of numerous audio technologies; Alan Guth (Physics, 1968), astrophysicist and professor of physics at MIT; Timothy Carney (1966), former US Ambassador to Sudan and Haiti; Gerald Sussman (Mathematics, 1968), professor of computer science at MIT; Geoffrey A. Landis (Physics and Electrical Engineering, 1980), NASA scientist and science fiction writer; Ronald T. Raines (Chemistry and Biology, 1980), professor of chemistry at MIT; Cady Coleman (Chemistry, 1983), NASA Astronaut; Wes Bush (1983), former Chairman and CEO, Northrop Grumman; Warren Madden (1985), Weather Channel meteorologist; Jonathan Gruber (Economics, 1987), healthcare economist and political advisor; Charles Korsmo (Physics, 2000), actor in movies such as Hook and Can't Hardly Wait; Ed Miller (Physics and Electrical Engineering, 2000), noted poker authority; and Katy Croff Bell (Ocean Engineering, 2000), National Geographic ocean explorer.

Burton-Conner House

Burton-Conner House, (shortened to Burton-Conner or BC), is located at 410 Memorial Drive, on the north bank of the Charles River. Burton-Conner houses 344 residents. The building is five stories high, plus a ground floor.

Burton-Conner is a combination of two major sections of the former "Riverside" hotel and apartment building, which MIT acquired and reopened as a dormitory in 1950. "Burton House" consists of the 3 westernmost wings, while "Conner Hall" comprises the remaining 2 wings of the extended E-shaped structure. The two sections of the building are physically separated by a firewall above the ground floor, with five residential floors on the Burton side and four on the Conner side.

In the 1960s, a dining hall was added at the rear of Burton-Conner, on the side away from the river. Some years later, the dining hall was shut down and the space became the Porter Room, a shared meeting and student event space. The entire building underwent a complete restructuring during 1970–1971, when the internal layout was changed from a floor orientation (with floor-wide bathrooms and communal showers) to a suite orientation (introducing kitchens, suite lounges, and semi-private bathrooms). Today, Burton-Conner amenities include a library with Athena-network computers, a study area, an electronics lab and darkroom (unused for over 10 years), music rooms, a game room, weight and exercise rooms, and a lounge with a snack bar.

In February 2019, the MIT administration announced that Burton-Conner would be closed from June 2020 to August 2022 for a complete renovation. Dorm residents expressed concerns about interim housing and the effects this might have on dorm culture.

East Campus 

Variously known as East Campus, East Campus Alumni Memorial Houses, and Fred the Dorm, East Campus is MIT's second oldest dormitory after Senior House. Located at 3 Ames Street, it is an undergraduate dorm formed from six "houses", each named after an alumnus of MIT:

East Campus is arranged in two long north–south buildings, the East Parallel (one house built in 1924, extended to full parallel in 1928) and the West Parallel (built in 1931). The buildings are numbered 64 and 62, respectively, in MIT's building numbering system. There are 5 floors, plus a non-residential basement, in each building. The three "houses" that make up a building are connected on each floor, functioning as one contiguous building. The two building basements are connected via a tunnel.

The dorm celebrated its 90th anniversary in 2014. Due to the dorm's age, sturdiness, and tradition, the 350-400 undergrads living there are allowed to paint and alter rooms and floor common spaces, up to the limits of what the Cambridge fire code will allow. Students frequently use technology to customize their rooms, building projects such as an Emergency Pizza Button to have a local pizza shop deliver a cheese pizza, a disco dance floor, and an automatic door-unlocking system.

Notable alumni of East Campus include Ahmed Chalabi (Mathematics, 1965) of the Iraqi National Congress; George Smoot (Mathematics and Physics, 1966), co-recipient of the 2006 Nobel Prize in Physics; Jacob K. White (Electrical Engineering and Computer Science, 1980), MIT professor and IEEE Fellow; Michael Fincke (Aeronautics and Astronautics, 1989, and Earth, Atmospheric, and Planetary Sciences, 1989), NASA astronaut; and Thomas Massie (Electrical Engineering, 1993), US Representative for Kentucky.

MacGregor House 

MacGregor House, located at 450 Memorial Drive, was designed by Pietro Belluschi, built in 1970, and named for Frank S. MacGregor (SB 1907, Physics). It consists of a 16-story high-rise tower, connected to a four-story low-rise surrounding a paved courtyard. Both parts consist of suites grouped into "entries" of three to four floors each. The entries are named by letter: A, B, C, D, and E entries are located in the tower and F, G, H, and J entries are located in the low-rise. There is no I-entry, because i is imaginary. The ground floor consists mostly of dorm-wide common areas.

Each suite in MacGregor houses six to eight people, usually coed; the entire dorm houses 326 undergrads. Almost all rooms in MacGregor are singles; the three doubles in F entry are an architectural anomaly. Each suite comes equipped with a bathroom and a kitchen area with a 4-burner electric range-top; in addition, one suite in an entry also has an oven.

MacGregor features various amenities, including a music room, game room, and weight room. A convenience store (MacCon) was located inside MacGregor on the first floor, but closed in 2017.

The building and its surroundings are well known on campus for fierce winds and gusts during stormy weather. A computational fluid dynamics (CFD) study examined the causes of this phenomenon in detail, but did not propose any specific measures to ameliorate it.

Maseeh Hall 

Maseeh Hall is located at 305 Memorial Drive, at the intersection of Memorial Drive and Massachusetts Avenue, across the Avenue from MIT's Building 1. The building itself predates MIT's move to Cambridge in 1916. It was originally operated as the "Riverbank Court Hotel" from 1901 to 1937. In 1938, MIT reopened it as "Graduate House", later renaming it "Ashdown House" after its first faculty housemaster, Avery Allen Ashdown. By the beginning of the 21st century, the building had become run-down and in need of renovation. Graduate students were moved out, to a new Ashdown House (NW35) located much further away, a controversial decision justified by a desire to house all undergrads as close as possible to MIT's central campus. The exterior of the emptied building was immediately repaired to stop water leaks and further deterioration, but there was no funding to renovate the interior of the structure.

In 2010, Fariborz Maseeh (ScD 1990, Civil Engineering) donated $24 million for the purpose of increasing MIT's undergraduate enrollment by 270 students (an increase of 6%). To enable this, the number of undergraduate dormitory beds needed to be increased, since MIT now requires all undergraduate students to live in dormitories on campus for at least their first year. Fariborz Maseeh's donation was used to renovate the building, and the building now bears his name.

Maseeh Hall was first opened to undergrad residents in August 2011. Upon its re-opening, Maseeh Hall was MIT's largest undergrad dorm with 462 beds; in 2013, the building's occupancy was further increased to 490.

The lobby of Maseeh Hall is architecturally notable for its spacious vaulting and mosaic decorations made of Guastavino tile.

McCormick Hall 
McCormick Hall, located at 320 Memorial Drive, is a women-only dormitory housing 237 undergrads. It consists of two 8-floor towers (the east tower and the west tower) and an annex converted from two adjacent brownstone buildings. The three sections are connected on the ground floor. Each tower has a penthouse on the top floor that looks out on the Boston skyline. The east tower has only singles while the west tower has singles, doubles, and triples. The funds for building McCormick Hall came from Katharine Dexter McCormick (SB 1904, Biology), a leading biologist, suffragist, and philanthropist in the early twentieth century. McCormick Hall was designed to advocate and encourage female participation in the field of STEM, supporting gender equality in the former U.S. educational system.

Herbert Beckwith, a faculty of the MIT architecture department, was the designer of McCormick Hall. The west tower was first built in 1963 and  the east tower was built later in 1967.

New House 

New House, sometimes referred to as New West Campus Houses, houses 291 undergraduates at 471—476 Memorial Drive. The dormitory is a series of six joined five-story buildings arranged in a zig-zag fashion, each named after alumni. There are kitchens and common areas scattered throughout the dormitory. There is a tunnel connecting New House and neighboring MacGregor House.

New House was constructed in 1975 and holds nine separate living groups. From 2017 to 2018, New House underwent an extensive renovation to upgrade infrastructure and improve quality of life. The renovation improved accessibility, enhanced environmental sustainability, and brought in new amenities. New features of the renovated dorm included an arcade, an improved first-floor lounge, and interconnected corridors on upper floors.

However, residents lamented the significant impact on student communities that resulted from the renovation project. Students noted that the "pre-existing culture of New House...has largely been lost", pointing to the stress of having to frequently move between temporary housing buildings and the difficulty of rebuilding communities in such circumstances. The renovation destroyed historical murals painted by former students, further contributing to the sense of a loss of culture and tradition.

New Vassar 

New Vassar is the newest completed dormitory, opening for the first time in spring semester 2021. The building is located at 189 Vassar Street, the site of a former parking facility named West Garage. The dorm was approved in December 2017, and construction commenced with the demolition of the garage in January 2018. The new dormitory is scheduled to open in late 2020 with a capacity of 450 residents.

On February 28, 2019, an accident at the construction site killed one worker and injured two others. Evidence suggests that a material collapse from an upper floor fell down on top of the three workers.

MIT portrays New Vassar as a "living-learning community" that helps students grow both academically and personally. Dorm amenities, including a dining hall, a communal kitchen, a courtyard, a makerspace, and group study lounges, were chosen to promote social engagement. The building's design also prioritized environmental sustainability, targeting a LEED Gold certification.

However, MIT students have criticized the design process for New Vassar as "a history of broken promises", with valuable student feedback "destroyed by top-down administrative backtracking". Early in the design stage for New Vassar, MIT administrators sought student input to articulate a set of guiding principles for future dorms, making mutually acceptable compromise between student well-being and administrative needs. Later, administrators unilaterally reversed several decisions without student approval. The incident drew heavy criticism of MIT's leadership and decision-making process, with extensive student feedback and cooperation regularly being overturned with "vague appeals" to statistical data.

Next House 

Next House, located at 500 Memorial Drive, is five stories tall and houses about 350 people. Patterned after the success of Baker House, it opened in September 1981. The "Next House" designation was unofficial and thought to be temporary until a sufficient donation had been received to name the dorm. As a result, the institute has nearly always referred to the building as 500 Memorial Drive, while students have always called the dorm "Next House".

The first level is home to the Tastefully Furnished Lounge (TFL), along with music practice rooms, Next Dining (open daily to all MIT students for breakfast and dinner), Athena computing cluster, and workout rooms. The TFL was so named at the first Next House governance meeting, the words "Tastefully Furnished Lounge" originally appeared in an official brochure distributed at the dedication ceremonies for MacGregor House, and were ironically adopted because the space was initially barely furnished at all. The Next House basement level offers a laundry room, game area, and the Country Kitchen.

Random Hall 

Random Hall located at 290 Massachusetts Avenue, was created by the joining of two old, identical buildings, a process known to some residents as "siamization". It is the oldest building owned by MIT, and lacks elevators. Originally built in 1894, the building was converted to a visiting students and overflow dormitory in 1968. In the spring and summer of 1977, it was quickly remodeled for undergraduate use to accommodate the unexpectedly large matriculation of the Class of 1981.

Random Hall is the smallest of the MIT dorms, housing only about 93 undergraduates. Its location is also unique among undergraduate dorms, being about a block past the northern border of the main campus. Random Hall was known for its early implementation of bathroom and laundry machine online servers, which allowed people to determine remotely whether bathrooms and washers or dryers are in use.

Random Hall is home of The Milk, a -year-old carton of rancid milk. The carton was originally purchased by Justin O. Cave '98 in 1994 for the purpose of making macaroni and cheese. After forgetting to consume it, residents of Random Hall rediscovered it ten months after its expiration date. The incident gave rise to several activities and celebrations regarding The Milk, including birthday parties, awards for the "Ugliest Manifestation on Campus", and a joke application for admission to MIT. The Milk was declared missing on August 20, 2022 and has yet to be found.

Simmons Hall 

Simmons Hall located at 229 Vassar Street, was designed by architect Steven Holl and dedicated in 2002. At the cost of $78.5 million, it is MIT's most expensive dormitory built on campus since Baker House.

An average single room has nine windows, each with its own small curtain. Internal design consists of one- and two-person rooms, plus lounges with and without kitchens. Rooms are roughly arranged into three towers (the "A", "B", and "C" towers). Simmons Hall has a dining hall and a late-night cafe. The building also has some more esoteric facilities, such as a large ball pit, an electronics makerspace, and a woodworking shop.

Many of the residents of Simmons complain that aesthetics came as a higher priority than functionality. For example, residents in the "A" tower must take two different elevators, or must walk the length of the building twice (more than an eighth of a mile) to reach the dining hall. Neither the "A" elevator nor "A" tower staircases reach the first floor, where the dining hall is located. Dormitory rooms are also equipped with custom-designed, modular furniture made of plywood. Student opinions on the furnishings are mixed, with praise for their modularity and criticism for their excessive weight and lack of durability.

The building has been nicknamed "The Sponge", because the architect consciously modeled its shape and internal structure on a sea sponge. Opinions on the aesthetics of the building remain strongly divided. Simmons Hall won the 2003 American Institute of Architects Honor Award for Architecture, and the 2004 Harleston Parker Medal, administered by the Boston Society of Architects and awarded to the "most beautiful piece of architecture building, monument or structure" in the Boston area. Simmons Hall was featured in the exhibit Inside the Sponge—Students Take on MIT Simmons Hall at the Canadian Centre for Architecture in Montreal in the fall of 2006. On the other hand, the building has been criticized as being ugly, a sentiment echoed in James Kunstler's Eyesore of the Month catalog.

As part of the MIT List Visual Arts Center's Percent-for-Art program, a piece was commissioned for the building by American artist Dan Graham. The sculpture, titled Yin Yang Pavilion, consists of a partially reflective, glass-walled, gravel-paved area in the shape of half of the yin-yang symbol in plan, while the other half contains a shallow pool of water.

Former undergraduate dorms
Some notable MIT undergraduate dorms have been closed down after an extensive operating history. Bexley Hall was demolished due to concerns about structural integrity. Senior House was disbanded, with the building converted to a graduate student residence, after administrative controversies.

Bexley Hall

Bexley Hall was a former MIT dormitory located at 46-52 Massachusetts Avenue. Bexley was an early twentieth century brick building, consisting of four four-story walkups surrounding a central courtyard. It was almost directly across the street from MIT's Building 7; old MIT official directories described it as being "just a stone's throw from the Institute's front door". As former apartments which were renovated in the 1970s, Bexley suites had full kitchens and bathrooms. The stout, soundproof walls of Bexley were extensively painted by students and were plastered with murals and graffiti, some of which dated back to the 1960s.

Long known for its alternative culture, Bexley was among the first MIT dormitories to officially become coed, housing 120 undergrads. Some residents owned pet cats and allowed them to roam free around the building, decades before MIT officially adopted a cat-friendly policy in 2008. The May 1970 Grateful Dead concerts at MIT were sponsored by Bexley's housemaster.

Following leads in the phone hacking case of Cap'n Crunch, the Federal Bureau of Investigation visited Bexley in the early 1970s. Twenty to thirty Bexley residents filled a living room and were "interviewed" by two FBI agents. "We shared popcorn, and asked them more questions than they asked us; the spirit was boisterous."

On May 7, 2013, MIT announced that Bexley Hall would be closed for up to three years, due to significant water damage inside the building's exterior walls that rendered the dormitory unsafe to live in. Bexley residents and others expressed considerable concern about the sudden disruption of student housing plans, and possible loss of the unique student culture that had evolved over the years. On October 17, 2013, MIT's Department of Facilities recommended that Bexley be demolished, deeming it too expensive to repair and bring up to modern building code. , the building has been completely removed, and a small park has been established in its place.

Notable alumni of Bexley Hall include Dan Bricklin, co-inventor of the computerized spreadsheet, and Jeff Sagarin, a sports computerized ratings guru who first became known through his ranking and odds (betting) lines in USA Today, but who later was hired by the NCAA to help with computerizing the basketball tournament selection process. Also among best-recognized former Bexley residents were Institute Professor Jerome Lettvin and his wife Maggie who were Bexley "houseparents" in the 1970s and early 1980s.

Senior House 

Senior House is the oldest dormitory at MIT and was the first self-governing college dormitory in the United States. Since its construction in 1916, it has served as the institute's first dormitory and on-campus fraternity, a mixed undergraduate and graduate dorm, an all-graduate facility, a seniors' dormitory, and military housing during World War II. The L-shaped building is directly adjacent to the residence of the President of MIT. A tower at the center of the north side features neo-classical columns that reflect the architecture of the original MIT Cambridge campus.

The building's street address is 4 Ames Street, but the mailing address is 70 Amherst Street, because the main entry was moved to what originally was the back of the building. Before implementation of a single-entry building layout, Senior House had six entries named after historical MIT figures:

Citing a low graduation rate and possible drug-related problems in Senior House, MIT administrators implemented a "turnaround program" in 2016 that included the banning of new students and the implementation of changes related to mental health and supervision. On June 12, 2017 it was announced that Senior House would be replaced with "Pilot 2021", a program to house mostly first-year students in a more regulated environment. The residence would no longer allow cats, murals, or other elements connected with "East-side" dorm culture. Many members of the East-side MIT community viewed the erasing of Senior House culture as an attack from the administration on their community values. Facing student resistance towards Pilot 2021, MIT announced on July 7, 2017 that the building would be completely emptied of undergraduates and repurposed as a graduate student dorm. This announcement triggered a new round of controversy and discussion among the MIT community. An article in Wired described the MIT dorm closure as part of a wider trend among American universities of emphasizing safety and orderliness while minimizing legal liability and bad publicity.

Notable alumni of Senior House include Janos Pasztor (Nuclear Engineering, 1979), former Assistant Secretary-General of the United Nations; John Brusger (Chemistry, 1978) founder of Newbury Comics; Lawrence Summers (Economics, 1975), former president of Harvard University and former Secretary of the Treasury during the Clinton Administration; Bruce Morrison (Chemistry, 1965), United States Representative for the 3rd Congressional District of Connecticut, 1983–1991; Moshe Arens (Mechanical Engineering, 1947), former member of the Israeli Knesset, defense minister, and ambassador to the United States; Gordon S. Brown (Electrical Engineering, 1931), former Dean of Engineering at MIT and a pioneer in the development of automatic-feedback systems and numerically controlled machine tools. Former Senior House faculty residents include Swiss musicologist, composer, pianist and conductor Ernst Levy; and John B. Goodenough, awarded the 2019 Nobel Prize in Chemistry for the development of the lithium-ion battery, lived in Senior House as faculty resident in the 1950s and 60s when he was part of an interdisciplinary team responsible for developing random access memory.

Graduate dorms
MIT graduate dorms include the following:
70 Amherst Street (formerly Senior House)
Ashdown House
Eastgate Apartments
Edgerton House
Graduate Tower at Site 4
Sidney-Pacific
Tang Residence Hall
The Warehouse
Westgate Apartments

Gallery

References

 

Massachusetts Institute of Technology buildings
Massachusetts Institute of Technology
Massachusetts Institute of Technology student life
Massachusetts Institute of Technology
Massachusetts Institute of Technology housing
Alvar Aalto buildings
Modernist architecture in Massachusetts